Kentucky Route 527 (KY 527) is a  state highway in the U.S. state of Kentucky. The route begins in Campbellsville at US Route 68 (US 68), KY 55, and KY 70 and continues north to Saloma. It enters Marion and Raywick before continuing north to St. Francis where it intersects with KY 52. The northern terminus is at an intersection  with KY 49 at Holy Cross.

Major intersections

References

0527
Transportation in Marion County, Kentucky
Transportation in Taylor County, Kentucky